La maestra (English title:The teacher) is a Mexican telenovela produced by Televisa and transmitted by Telesistema Mexicano.

Cast 
Enrique Lizalde
Blanca Sánchez
Rosario Granados
Sandra Chávez
Oscar Morelli
Jaime Fernández

References 

Mexican telenovelas
1971 telenovelas
Televisa telenovelas
Spanish-language telenovelas